Marcelo Tristão Athayde de Souza (born November 10, 1959), better known as Marcelo Tas, is a Brazilian director, writer, actor and television presenter.
Host of PROVOCA and commentator for Jornal da Cultura of TV Cultura. He works as a speaker and develops series on communication and innovation for companies, in 2020 he made 103 participations in events. He is also a professor at the Domestika platform and works in corporate training.
He was the main host of Torcedores.com for the coverage of the 2018 Soccer World Cup in Russia. Before: children's series "Ra-Tim-Bum" (TV Cultura - Brazil); “Ernesto Varela, the Reporter” (MTV Brasil, Gazeta, SBT, TV Record-Brasil); Telecurso (TV Globo / Roberto Marinho Foundation); and anchor for 7 years of the comedy program CQC (Band).

References

Other references
The (TV) Cultura lost his hand in an area that was the leader, tried to reinvent the wheel three times. The 'Rá-Tim-Bum', a project extremely daring and successful, was abandoned to turn the 'Castelo (Rá-Tim-Bum)', which was also very good. There had to stop. Instead of continuing, preferred to create 'Ilha Rá-Tim-Bum', which failed.
 In an interview with Quem criticizing the TV Cultura, the television station where he worked for several years. 
 In a news magazine Alfa, talks about his daughter being gay.

External links

  Official site

1959 births
Living people
Brazilian columnists
Brazilian male comedians
Brazilian television presenters
Brazilian male television actors
People from Ituverava